Anton Andreyevich Alikhanov (born 17 September 1986) is a Russian politician, candidate of economic sciences, and a lawyer. He has served as the governor of Kaliningrad Oblast since 29 September 2017.

Alikhanov was the youngest Governor in Russia until May 2018, when Dmitry Artyukhov became the Governor of the Yamal-Nenets Autonomous Okrug.

He is a member of the ruling party of Russian Federation United Russia.

Biography
Anton Alikhanov was born on September 17, 1986 in the city of Sukhumi (part of the Abkhaz ASSR) in the Georgian SSR, to a father of Caucasus Greek and Russian Cossack descent and a mother of Georgian and Russian descent.

According to media reports, his father Andrei Alikhanov was one of the founders of a large company Rosmysomoltorg (with a 20% stake) and is an old friend of former First Deputy Prime Minister Igor Shuvalov and businessman  Oleg Mitvol. In the 1990s, Mikhail Babich, Plenipotentiary Representative of the President of the Russian Federation in the Privolzhsky Federal District, worked with Anton's father.

He graduated from the All-Russian State Tax Academy of the Ministry of Finance of Russia with a major in Finance and Credit and Jurisprudence.

In 2010, he worked in the Ministry of Justice of the Russian Federation.

In 2012, at the Plekhanov Russian Economic University in Moscow, he defended his thesis for the degree of candidate of economic sciences on the topic "Managing costs for the development of the organizational culture of the company" in the specialty "Economics and management of the national economy (management)" (supervisor - Doctor of Economics, Professor A Govorin).

In 2013, he worked in the Ministry of Industry and Trade of the Russian Federation, where he served as Deputy Director of the Department of State Regulation of Foreign Trade Activities, then - Director.

On 14 August 2015, he became a member of the advisory council on industry at the board of the Eurasian Economic Commission.

On 22 September 2015, he was appointed Deputy Chairman of the Kaliningrad Regional Government in charge of agriculture and industry.

On 30 July 2016, he became Acting Chairman of the Government of the Kaliningrad Oblast.

On 6 October 2016, in accordance with Presidential Decree No. 529, President Vladimir Putin, appointed him Acting Governor of the Kaliningrad Oblast. He was confirmed in the post in the Russian gubernatorial election in 2017 by 81,06% votes of electors.

In March 2021 Alikhanov announced the intention to participate in the elections the governor of the Kaliningrad oblast' in 2022.

According to Putin, Anton Alikhanov was one of the authors of the medium-term plan for the strategic development of the Kaliningrad Oblast, which Alikhanov, already in a new position, together with the Government of the Russian Federation, is tasked to complete and develop.

Personal life

Anton Alikhanov is married to Daria Abramova and has two children. His wife’s grandfather, Mogeli Shalvovich Khubutia, is the chief doctor of the Moscow Research Institute of Sklifosovsky. Other relatives include the president of the Union of Georgians in Russia and businessman Mikhail Khubutia, own the company Rosimpex, which calls itself one of the largest suppliers of hunting and sporting weapons in Russia. The brother of the vice-governor - Georgy Alikhanov is studying at the Moscow State University of Medicine and Dentistry and playing in a musical group.

Income

The declared income of Anton Alikhanov in Russia in 2015 amounted to 2.209.919,98 rubles. In 2020 he earned 20,4 million rubles and owned three flats 210, 198.5 and 85,8 sq . m. and a Volkswagen Tiguan.

References

External links
 Антон Алиханов на сайте «Одноклассники». // ok.ru
 Биография Антона Андреевича Алиханова. Официальный портал Правительства Калининградской области // gov39.ru
 Евгений Уразбаев. Кто такой Антон Алиханов? — Что известно о втором человеке в калининградской власти. Еженедельная бесплатная информационная газета «Дворник’ъ» (Калининград), выпуск № 36 (1042), 20-27 сентября 2016 года. // dvornik.ru

1986 births
Living people
Russian people of Greek descent
Russian people of Georgian descent
People from Sukhumi
United Russia politicians
Financial University under the Government of the Russian Federation alumni
Governors of Kaliningrad Oblast